Endelus is a genus of beetles in the family Buprestidae, containing the following species:

 Endelus acutiplicis Obenberger, 1944
 Endelus aeneipennis Fisher, 1921
 Endelus aeneolus Obenberger, 1922
 Endelus aethiops Deyrolle, 1864
 Endelus agriliformis Fisher, 1921
 Endelus andamanensis Théry, 1932
 Endelus aphanisticinus Obenberger, 1924
 Endelus apicalis Deyrolle, 1864
 Endelus assamensis Obenberger, 1922
 Endelus aurovittatus Théry, 1932
 Endelus bakeri Kerremans, 1914
 Endelus bartoni Obenberger, 1932
 Endelus baumi Obenberger, 1929
 Endelus belial Obenberger, 1924
 Endelus bicarinatus Théry, 1932
 Endelus bilyi Kalashian, 1995
 Endelus birmanicus Kalashian, 1999
 Endelus borneensis Obenberger, 1924
 Endelus bos Théry, 1932
 Endelus brodskyi Kalashian, 1999
 Endelus brutus Deyrolle, 1864
 Endelus bryanti Théry, 1932
 Endelus bucephalus Obenberger, 1932
 Endelus calligraphus Banks, 1919
 Endelus carteri Holynski, 2003
 Endelus castaneocupreus Bellamy, 2007
 Endelus celebensis Théry, 1932
 Endelus chalybaeotinctus Obenberger, 1932
 Endelus cicindeloides Théry, 1932
 Endelus coeruleoniger Descarpentries & Villiers, 1963
 Endelus coeruleus Kerremans, 1900
 Endelus collaris (Saunders, 1873)
 Endelus collinus Obenberger, 1922
 Endelus coomani Théry, 1932
 Endelus coomanianus Descarpentries, 1948
 Endelus cornutus Kerremans, 1900
 Endelus corporaali Obenberger, 1922
 Endelus cupido Deyrolle, 1864
 Endelus cupreocingulatus Bellamy, 2007
 Endelus cupreoviridis Bellamy, 2007
 Endelus curtus Kerremans, 1892
 Endelus daoensis Kalashian, 1997
 Endelus diabolicus Kerremans, 1900
 Endelus difformis Deyrolle, 1864
 Endelus dohertyi Théry, 1932
 Endelus dohrni Théry, 1932
 Endelus drescheri Obenberger, 1932
 Endelus eduardi Kalashian, 1999
 Endelus elongatus Kerremans, 1900
 Endelus empyreus Deyrolle, 1864
 Endelus endymio Deyrolle, 1864
 Endelus fijiensis Bellamy, 2007
 Endelus formosae Obenberger, 1940
 Endelus foveolatus Kalashian, 1995
 Endelus gestroi Obenberger, 1924
 Endelus gracilipes Obenberger, 1940
 Endelus gratiosus Théry, 1932
 Endelus gyoerfii Apt, 1954
 Endelus gyulnarae Kalashian, 1995
 Endelus harmandi Théry, 1927
 Endelus hedwigae Obenberger, 1941
 Endelus helferi Cobos, 1964
 Endelus himalayanus Bílý, 1983
 Endelus ianthinipennis Obenberger, 1922
 Endelus imperator Obenberger, 1937
 Endelus inaequalipennis Obenberger, 1937
 Endelus intermedius Deyrolle, 1864
 Endelus japonicus Obenberger, 1944
 Endelus jendeki Kalashian, 1997
 Endelus kareni Kalashian, 1997
 Endelus kerremansellus Obenberger, 1935
 Endelus klapperichi Obenberger, 1944
 Endelus kubani Kalashian, 1995
 Endelus lameyi Théry, 1932
 Endelus laosensis Baudon, 1968
 Endelus lineolus Obenberger, 1932
 Endelus louwerensi Obenberger, 1937
 Endelus lunatus Fisher, 1921
 Endelus marseulii Deyrolle, 1864
 Endelus mephistopheles Gestro, 1877
 Endelus minutus Kerremans, 1900
 Endelus morio Obenberger, 1922
 Endelus morulus Fisher, 1935
 Endelus nepalensis Bílý, 1983
 Endelus nitidus Kerremans, 1896
 Endelus olexai Kalashian, 1999
 Endelus opacipennis Kurosawa, 1985
 Endelus ornatipennis Fisher, 1926
 Endelus ovalis Théry, 1932
 Endelus pacholatkoi Kalashian, 1999
 Endelus palawanensis Fisher, 1921
 Endelus papua Obenberger, 1940
 Endelus parallelus Kerremans, 1900
 Endelus pendleburyi Fisher, 1936
 Endelus perroti Descarpentries & Villiers, 1963
 Endelus pseudoperroti Kalashian, 1999
 Endelus pyrrosiae Kurosawa, 1985
 Endelus quadraticollis Kerremans, 1894
 Endelus sapaensis Kalashian, 1995
 Endelus sauteri Kerremans, 1912
 Endelus scintillans Deyrolle, 1864
 Endelus signatus Kerremans, 1900
 Endelus similis Descarpentries & Villiers, 1963
 Endelus sinensis Théry, 1932
 Endelus smaragdinus Descarpentries & Villiers, 1963
 Endelus sommeri Obenberger, 1940
 Endelus speculifer Théry, 1932
 Endelus strandiellus Obenberger, 1932
 Endelus subcornutus Kerremans, 1900
 Endelus subviolaceus Cobos, 1964
 Endelus sulcicollis Heller, 1900
 Endelus sumatrae Obenberger, 1940
 Endelus sumatrensis Fisher, 1926
 Endelus suturalis Théry, 1932
 Endelus taurus Théry, 1932
 Endelus toxopeusi Obenberger, 1932
 Endelus tristis (Kerremans, 1900)
 Endelus violaceipennis Fisher, 1921
 Endelus viridimaculatus Deyrolle, 1864
 Endelus viridiventris Théry, 1932
 Endelus weyersi Ritsema, 1888
 Endelus wittmeri Bílý, 1983

References

Buprestidae genera